Amata mestralii is a moth of the family Erebidae first described by Charles-Juste Bugnion in 1837. It is found in Israel and Syria.

References

mestralii
Moths described in 1837
Moths of the Middle East